Elk River Wildlife Management Area is located on  east of Sutton in Braxton County, West Virginia.  It protects lands along the Holly River and Elk River upstream of Sutton Lake.

See also

Animal conservation
Fishing
Hunting
List of West Virginia rivers
List of West Virginia wildlife management areas

References

External links
West Virginia DNR District 3 Wildlife Management Areas
WVDNR map of Elk River Wildlife Management Area

Wildlife management areas of West Virginia
Protected areas of Braxton County, West Virginia
Elk River (West Virginia)
IUCN Category V